Baron Hayter, of Chislehurst in the County of Kent, is a title in the Peerage of the United Kingdom. It was created in 1927 for the businessman Sir George Chubb, 1st Baronet. He had already been created a baronet of Newlands in the Baronetage of the United Kingdom in 1900. Chubb was chairman and managing director of the firm Chubb and Sons Lock and Safe Co Ltd, established by his grandfather Charles Chubb in the early 19th century. "Hayter" was the maiden name of George Hayter Chubb's mother, and was selected in preference to "Chubb", as it was not considered appropriate for names of corporations to be attributed to members of the House of Lords. He was succeeded by his son, the second baron. He was managing director of Chubb and Sons Lock and Safe Co Ltd. His son, the third baron, was managing director and chairman of Chubb and Sons Lock and Safe Co Ltd and also served as deputy chairman of the House of Lords from 1981 to 1995.  the titles are held by the latter's son, the fourth baron, who succeeded in 2003.

Chubb Baronets, of Newlands (1900)
Sir George Hayter Chubb, 1st Baronet (1848–1946) (created Baron Hayter in 1927)

Barons Hayter (1927)
George Hayter Chubb, 1st Baron Hayter (1848–1946)
Charles Archibald Chubb, 2nd Baron Hayter (1871–1967)
George Charles Hayter Chubb, 3rd Baron Hayter (1911–2003)
(George) William Michael Chubb, 4th Baron Hayter (born 1943)

The heir apparent is the present holder's only son, Hon. Thomas Frederick Flackl Chubb (born 1986).

Arms

Notes

References
Kidd, Charles, Williamson, David (editors). Debrett's Peerage and Baronetage (1990 edition). New York: St Martin's Press, 1990, 

Baronies in the Peerage of the United Kingdom
Noble titles created in 1927